Coming from the Sky is the first full-length album by the French power metal band Heavenly. It was released on 25 July 2000 by Noise Records.

Track listing

Personnel

Band members
Benjamin Sotto – vocals
Maxence Pilo – drums
Chris Savourey – guitars
Laurent Jean – bass

Additional musicians
Piet Sielck - guitars, additional lead vocals on track 4
Kai Hansen - additional lead vocals on track 4
Thomas Nack - drums, percussion on track 1
Jan-Sören Eckert - background vocals

Production
Piet Sielck - producer, engineer
Thomas Nack - engineer

References 

2000 debut albums
Heavenly (French band) albums
Noise Records albums